Jacob Ifan Prytherch (born 1993) is a Welsh actor, best known for his lead role as Jake Vickers in the BBC police drama series Cuffs.

Ifan graduated from the Royal Welsh College of Music and Drama in 2015, having already started shooting Cuffs.

Filmography

Television

Film

References

External links
 

1993 births
Living people
Welsh-speaking actors
Welsh male television actors
Date of birth missing (living people)
Alumni of the Royal Welsh College of Music & Drama
21st-century Welsh male actors
Male actors from Cardiff
People educated at Ysgol Gyfun Gymunedol Penweddig